Protanilla schoedli is a species of ant in the genus Protanilla. It was first described in 2006 from a gyne collected in Sri Lanka. It is named after Stefan Schödl.

References

External links

 at antwiki.org
Animaldiversity.org
Itis.org

Leptanillinae
Hymenoptera of Asia
Insects described in 2006